Fred Clark (born May 14, 1959) is an American conservationist, businessman, and Democratic politician.  He served three terms in the Wisconsin State Assembly, representing Baraboo and surrounding municipalities in central Wisconsin.

Background 
Born in Ann Arbor, Michigan, Clark graduated from Huron High School in Ann Arbor in 1977. He attended Michigan Technological University before earning a B.S. from Michigan State University in 1985, and an M.S. in Forest Science from the University of Wisconsin–Madison 1992. He served as a Senior Forester with the Wisconsin Department of Natural Resources and an ecologist with The Nature Conservancy.

Clark is now a consulting forester, owner of Clark Forestry in Baraboo. Clark Forestry provides forestry management and consulting services to family forest owners, farmers, environmental groups, and government agencies throughout Wisconsin. He is a member of the Society of American Foresters, The Nature Conservancy, and the National Wild Turkey Federation.

Public service 
Clark was appointed by Republican Governor Tommy Thompson to the Lower Wisconsin Riverway Board in 1998, where he served as a representative for Columbia County. In 2004, Clark was appointed by Democratic Governor Jim Doyle to the Wisconsin Council on Forestry, where he leads the council's invasive species committee.

Clark was first elected to the Assembly in 2008, defeating incumbent Republican J.A. "Doc" Hines by a substantial margin (15,936 to 11,304); he was assigned to the standing committees on forestry, (of which he became chair in December 2009), on natural resources, and on rural economic development, and the Wisconsin Council on Tourism. He was reelected in 2010 by a narrow margin (10,208 votes to 9921 for Republican Jack Cummings); he became the Minority Caucus Vice Chairperson for the 2011–2012 session.

In March 2011 Clark moved his desk outside of the capital building to meet with constituents, because of difficulties the public was having entering the building, as a result of an "essential" lock-down of the building to dissuade protests of Governor Walker and his efforts to strip collective bargaining rights away from teachers in Wisconsin.

On April 21, 2011, Clark announced his candidacy for the 14th district seat in the Wisconsin Senate, in the recall election against Luther Olsen, as part of the 2011 Wisconsin protests.

In the recall election, Clark was endorsed by the Capital Times, which described him as the "more able, independent and responsible candidate." He lost the race, with Olsen polling fifty-two percent to Clark's forty-eight percent.

Clark did not run for a fourth term in 2014 and instead endorsed Dave Considine, who succeeded him.

On February 27, 2019, it was announced that Wisconsin governor Tony Evers appointed Clark to the Department of Natural Resources board. He is replacing Preston Cole who was appointed to the board, by Evers, in December 2018. According to Laurie Ross, the DNR board liaison, Clark was appointed to the position on February 22, 2019

References

External links

Campaign website (Archived August 6, 2014)

Politicians from Ann Arbor, Michigan
Democratic Party members of the Wisconsin State Assembly
Michigan State University alumni
University of Wisconsin–Madison College of Agricultural and Life Sciences alumni
American foresters
1959 births
Living people
People from Baraboo, Wisconsin
21st-century American politicians